Ernest Boulton (1889 – 1959) was an English footballer who played for Stoke.

Career
Boulton was born in Stoke-upon-Trent and played for local side, Stoke where he scored six goals in eleven matches during the 1910–11 season.

Career statistics

References

English footballers
Stoke City F.C. players
1889 births
1959 deaths
Association football forwards